Monia is a genus of bivalves belonging to the family Anomiidae.

The species of this genus are found in Europe, Japan and Australia.

Species:

Anomia alterans 
Monia alternans 
Monia colon 
Monia deliciosa 
Monia nobilis 
Monia timida 
Monia zelandica 
Pododesmus anitae 
Pododesmus noharai

References

Anomiidae
Bivalve genera